Michael Van Staeyen (born 13 August 1988 in Ekeren) is a Belgian former professional road racing cyclist, who competed as a professional from 2008 until 2022.

In March 2022, Van Staeyen announced that he would retire from professional cycling after the following month's Scheldeprijs.

Major results

2008
 2nd Antwerpse Havenpijl
 3rd Omloop der Kempen
 4th Ronde van Overijssel
 5th Münsterland Giro
2009
 1st Stage 4 Istrian Spring Trophy
 1st Stage 3 Vuelta Ciclista a León
 3rd Ronde van Noord-Holland
 4th Arno Wallaard Memorial
 4th Omloop der Kempen
 4th Antwerpse Havenpijl
 8th Schaal Sels
2010
 1st Stadsprijs Geraardsbergen
 1st Memorial Rik Van Steenbergen
 1st Stage 2 Danmark Rundt
 5th Overall Tour de Picardie
 5th Schaal Sels
 7th Omloop van het Houtland
2011
 3rd Schaal Sels
 3rd Kampioenschap van Vlaanderen
 5th Dutch Food Valley Classic
 5th Grote Prijs Jef Scherens
 8th Memorial Rik Van Steenbergen
 9th Omloop van het Waasland
 9th Paris–Brussels
 9th Grand Prix Impanis-Van Petegem
 9th Nationale Sluitingsprijs
 10th Grand Prix de Denain
2012
 2nd Grote Prijs Stad Geel
 2nd Münsterland Giro
 2nd Nationale Sluitingsprijs
 4th Paris–Brussels
 5th Ronde van Limburg
 5th Dutch Food Valley Classic
 5th Grand Prix Impanis-Van Petegem
 5th Omloop van het Houtland
 5th De Kustpijl
 8th Halle–Ingooigem
 9th Overall World Ports Classic
2013
 1st Stage 1 Étoile de Bessèges
 2nd Schaal Sels
 3rd Kampioenschap van Vlaanderen
 4th Grand Prix Criquielion
 4th Ronde van Zeeland Seaports
 4th ProRace Berlin
 4th Münsterland Giro
 5th Tour de Vendée
 5th Paris–Tours
 5th Nationale Sluitingsprijs
 6th Binche–Chimay–Binche
 8th Dutch Food Valley Classic
 8th Omloop van het Houtland
 9th Omloop van het Waasland
 10th Handzame Classic
 10th Scheldeprijs
2014
 1st De Kustpijl
 3rd Ronde van Zeeland Seaports
 3rd Halle–Ingooigem
 4th Brussels Cycling Classic
 4th Kampioenschap van Vlaanderen
 5th Omloop van het Waasland
 5th Velothon Berlin
 5th Ronde van Limburg
 9th Binche–Chimay–Binche
2015
 5th Brussels Cycling Classic
 6th Classica Corsica
 8th Scheldeprijs
 9th Overall World Ports Classic
2017
 8th Ronde van Limburg
 8th Tacx Pro Classic
2019
 3rd Schaal Sels
 4th Omloop Mandel-Leie-Schelde
 6th Grote Prijs Marcel Kint
 6th Grand Prix Pino Cerami
2020
 7th Gooikse Pijl
2021
 5th Dorpenomloop Rucphen

References

External links
 
 Biography at Topsport Vlaanderen

Belgian male cyclists
Living people
1988 births
Cyclists from Antwerp
People from Ekeren